André Aumerle (16 February 1907 – 24 October 1990) was a French cyclist. He competed in the three events at the 1928 Summer Olympics.

References

External links
 

1907 births
1990 deaths
French male cyclists
Olympic cyclists of France
Cyclists at the 1928 Summer Olympics
Sportspeople from Aveyron
Cyclists from Occitania (administrative region)